Ampelokipoi–Menemeni is a municipality of the Thessaloniki Urban Area in the regional unit of Thessaloniki, Central Macedonia, Greece. The seat of the municipality is in Ampelokipoi.

Municipality
The municipality Ampelokipoi–Menemeni was formed at the 2011 local government reform by the merger of the following 2 former municipalities, that became municipal units:
Ampelokipoi
Menemeni

References

Municipalities of Central Macedonia
Populated places in Thessaloniki (regional unit)